Zrinka Ljutić (born 26 January 2004) is a Croatian World Cup alpine ski racer and specializes in the technical events of slalom and giant slalom.  She  made her World Cup debut at age 16 in December 2020 and competed at the 2022 Winter Olympics, in slalom and giant slalom.

In the 2022 World Cup season, Ljutić finished thirtieth in the slalom standings.

World Cup results

Season standings

Results per discipline

World Championship results

Olympic Games

References

External links

2004 births
Croatian female alpine skiers
Alpine skiers at the 2022 Winter Olympics
Olympic alpine skiers of Croatia
Living people